Nexor Limited is a privately held company based in Nottingham, providing product and services to safeguard government, defence and critical national infrastructure computer systems. It was originally known as X-Tel Services Limited.

History 
Nexor Limited was founded in 1989 as X-Tel Services Limited out of the University of Nottingham and UCL, following research into X.400 and X.500 systems for the ISODE project.
In 1992 Stephen Kingan joined the business as CEO. 
In 1993 X-Tel Services Limited was renamed Nexor Limited.
In 1996 3i invested in the business to launch Nexor Inc.
In 2004 Kingan and Nigel Fasey acquired the business.
In 2008 Colin Robbins was appointed to the board as CTO.
In 2012 Kingan acquired 100% ownership of Nexor.
October 2013, the company moved headquarters from Nottingham Science Park to the NG2 Business Park.

Nexor customers include NATO, European Defence Agency, UK MoD, US DOD, Canadian DND, Foreign and Commonwealth Office and Met Office.
Nexor designed and deployed the first public Internet search engine ALIWEB and the associated robots exclusion standard.
Nexor is a contributor to the Internet Engineering Task Force, having worked on Internet RFCs 1086, 1165, 1488, 1606 and 1778.
Nexor developed a Microsoft Exchange Client for Unix.
Nexor was the first organisation to be awarded the Intellect Best Practice Certificate.
Nexor has run regular demonstrations at the Coalition Warrior Interoperability Demonstration.
Nexor the first organisation to achieve TickItPlus a quality-management certification program for software development.
Nexor have strategic partnerships with Boldon James and QinetiQ.
Nexor's Data Diode product is supplied via an OEM relationship with Fox-IT.
Nexor is a supplier on the UK Government G-Cloud Cloudstore, and an Official cyber security supplier to the UK Government.
Nexor won 2013 DSEi innovation challenge.

Nexor is a contributor to Cyber Champions a community initiative to promote best practices in digital literacy and online safety awareness to schools, youth organisations and interest groups across the UK.
Nexor sponsor the Cyber Security Challenge designed to promote careers in cyber security. Nexor was in the first batch of companies to achieve the UK’s Cyber Essential standard and a contributor and industry launch partner to the PAS754 software development standard led by the Trustworthy Software Initiative.  In 2015 Nexor launched a consulting arm - Qonex

Products and services 
Nexor is primarily focused on Secure Information Exchange for defence, 
governments and critical infrastructure.

Products and services include:
 Data Diodes to enforce one way data flows
 Data Guards and High Assurance Guards to authorise and filter email and data communications
 Cross Domain Solutions and Information Exchange Gateways to enable secure information exchange between secure networks
 CyberShield Secure to ensure secure development and deployment of Nexor's technology
 Military Message Handling System

Assurance 
Several Nexor products have been evaluated under the Common Criteria scheme to obtain independent verification of their claimed functionality, including:
 Nexor Sentinel, EAL4+ (Jan 2013) 
 Nexor Data Diode, EAL7+ (June 2010) 
 Nexor MMHS, EAL2 (March 2005)

Collaborative research and development 
Nexor has been a contributor on the following collaborative research and development projects:

Paradise 
Paradise (1989-2002) (Piloting a Research Directory in an OSI Environment) was part of the ESPRIT COSINE  project to establish a pan-European computer-based network infrastructure that enabled research workers to communicate with each other using OSI.  It was later prefixed NameFlow-Paradise. Paradise implemented a distributed X.500 systems, across over 700 DSAs in over 30 countries. The project is documented in the NameFLOW archive Quipu was the major X.500 implementation used in Paradise.  Implementations also came from Inria led by Christian Huitema and Siemens DirX, originating from the Thorn  project, implementing the ECMA TR32 standard.  David Goodman was the project manager.

MAITS (Multilingual Application Interface for Telematic Services) developed multilingual interfaces for X.400 and X.500 on top of Paradise.

Password 
Password   (1993-1995) (Piloting a Secure Service Within OSI R&D) was a European Community-sponsored VALUE program,  comprising consortia from France (Inria), Germany (GMD Darmstadt) and the UK (UCL and Nexor), to establish a pilot security infrastructure
for network applications for the European research community.  The
consortium developed secured applications based on X.509, including the OSISEC PKI.  The primary application was PEM, a forerunner of S/MIME and SEEOTI.  Goodman of UCL was the project manager, and Joerg Reichelt  was the Nexor lead engineer.

Eurocoop and Eurocode 
Eurocoop (1991-1992) (Esprit III Project 5303) and the follow on project 
Eurocode (1992-1995)  (Esprit III Project 6155) aimed to develop powerful and effective systems for supporting distributed collaborative work. Partners included Aarhus University, GMD Darmstadt, Rank Xerox and ICL.
The approach adopted was to integrate components from a number of existing systems and to develop new collaborative tools based on the study of a large-scale technical application that encompasses many collaboration problems. Single components tools were developed that can be integrated with existing tools and that are able to interoperate with each other.  ICW was a closely related DTI funded project.
Pippa Hennessy was the Nexor project manager.

Regis and Renaissance 
Regis (1995–1998) was a collaborative project with Diamond Cable Communications and University of Sheffield to investigate problems inherent in providing regional business communities with low-cost, high-speed access to local information services.  Robbins was the Nexor project manager.

The EU ACTS Project Renaissance (1995–97) was led by Fretwell Downing to develop a virtual vocational training environment, with the 
University of Sheffield, Diamond Cable Communications and Yorkshire Cable and delivered to the UK National Centre for Popular Music. Harold Combs was the Nexor project manager.

iGRC 
The iGRC  project (2010-2012), was a collaborative project with HP, Assuria, Infogov, Cranfield University, Loughborough University and Birkbeck, University of London to automate threat level and control status changes for real-time management of the complexity, risk and resilience of secure information infrastructure.

CloudFilter 
CloudFilter   (2012–13) was an EPSRC collaborative project with Imperial College to explore novel methods for exercising control over sensitive data propagation across multiple cloud providers.

Cross Domain Tactical Service Bus 
A project led by 2iC to deliver a proof-of-concept demonstration for a Cross Domain Tactical Service Bus, winning the DSEI Innovation Award 2013.

KTP 
Project with De Montfort University to research, develop and implement the use of hardware, as a robust alternative to software in high assurance network security devices.

CSIIS 
The Defence Science and Technology Laboratory (Dstl) on behalf of the UK Ministry of Defence established a programme to realise the potential benefits from novel technology to front line forces. A consortium, led by QinetiQ (called Sirius, comprising over 40 organisations) provides the experience and research capability for CSIIS. In September 2014, Nexor won the best research poster at the Annual Symposium of the UK Information Assurance Advisory Council (IAAC) based on CSIIS work.

CAPRI 
An innovate UK funded consortium to lead R&D in connected and autonomous CAVs on-road implementation, in which Nexor provided cyber security services.

Personnel and alumni 

Many Nexor employees (current and former) have made notable contributions to the Internet or business community, including:
 Stephen Kingan (1992–present) – Chairman and CEO. Kingan was also a non-executive director of Investors in People (2005-2011)  and is a founding member of the Security and Resilience Industry Council (RISC).
 Martijn Koster (1992–1995) – Creator of ALIWEB, the first Internet search engine.
 Dr Graeme Lunt (1990–2004) — Co-founder of Nexor and creator of the first UNIX X.400 User Agent for Microsoft Exchange. 
 Mark Harman (2012–present) – Non-executive Director
 Julian Onions (1990–2013) – Co-founder of Nexor and messaging expert behind PP, author of RFCs 1086, 1165 and 1606.  
 Colin Robbins (1990–present) – Technical Director and co-author of LDAP.
 Dr Hugh Smith (1990–2000) – Co-founder of Nexor, while a Reader in Computer Science at the University of Nottingham. Smith became an owner of EIBS, an evolution of the Regis project.  Smith died in 2020.

References

External links 

 Nexor Corporate Web Site
 Qonex - Nexor's consulting division

Companies based in Nottingham
Computer security companies
Privately held companies of the United Kingdom
Science and technology in Nottinghamshire
Software companies of the United Kingdom